Nyssa aquatica, commonly called the water tupelo, cottongum, wild olive, large tupelo, tupelo-gum, or water-gum, is a large, long-lived tree in the tupelo genus (Nyssa) that grows in swamps and floodplains in the Southeastern United States.

Nyssa aquatica trunks have a swollen base that tapers up to a long, clear bole, and its root system is periodically under water. Water tupelo trees often occur in pure stands.

Names
Nyssa aquatica'''s genus name (Nyssa) refers to a Greek water nymph;  the species epithet aquatica, meaning ‘aquatic’, refers to its swamp and wetland habitat.

One of the species' common names, tupelo, is of Native American origin, coming from the Creek words ito ‘tree’ and  opilwa ‘swamp’;  it was in use by the mid-18th century

Uses
A large mature tree can produce commercial timber used for furniture and crates. The swollen base of the Nyssa aquatica is the source of a favored wood of wood carvers.

Many kinds of wildlife eat the fruit, and it is a favored honey tree.

Gallery

References

External links
Louisiana State University: page on Nyssa aquatica in America,
bioimages.vanderbilt.edu - Nyssa aquatica'' images
woodworkingnetwork.com: "All About Tupelo Wood"

aquatica
Freshwater plants
Trees of the Southeastern United States
Trees of mild maritime climate
Trees of the United States
Plants described in 1753
Taxa named by Carl Linnaeus